Connopus is a fungal genus in the family Marasmiaceae. The monotypic genus was circumscribed in 2010 to accommodate the species Connopus acervatus, formerly in the genus Gymnopus. It is found in North American and Europe, where it grows in dense clusters on decaying wood. It is regarded as inedible.

See also
 List of Marasmiaceae genera

References

 
 

Fungi of Europe
Fungi of North America
Marasmiaceae
Monotypic Agaricales genera
Taxa named by Ron Petersen